The  doubles Tournament at the 2006 NASDAQ-100 Open took place between March 20 and April 6 on the outdoor hard courts of the Tennis Center at Crandon Park in Key Biscayne, United States. Lisa Raymond and Samantha Stosur won the title, defeating Liezel Huber and Martina Navratilova in the final.

Seeds

Draw

Finals

Top half

Bottom half

References
 Main Draw

NASDAQ-100 Open - Doubles
Women's Doubles